Frank Costello (born Francesco Castiglia ; January 26, 1891 – February 18, 1973) was an Italian-American crime boss of the Luciano crime family. In 1957, Costello survived an assassination attempt ordered by Vito Genovese and carried out by Vincent Gigante. However, the altercation persuaded Costello to relinquish power to Genovese and retire. Costello died on February 18, 1973.

Early life
Costello was born on January 26, 1891, in Lauropoli, a frazione of the town of Cassano allo Ionio in the province of Cosenza in the Calabria region, Italy. In 1895, he boarded a ship to the United States with his mother and his brother Edward to join their father, who had moved to New York City's East Harlem several years earlier and opened a small neighborhood Italian grocery store.

While Costello was still a boy, his brother introduced him to gang activities. At 13, he had become a member of a local gang and started using the name Frankie. Costello committed petty crimes and went to jail for assault and robbery in 1908, 1912, and 1917. In 1918, he married Lauretta Geigerman, a Jewish woman who was the sister of a close friend. That same year, Costello served ten months in jail for carrying a concealed weapon.

Alliance with Luciano

While working for the Morello gang, Costello met Charlie "Lucky" Luciano, the Sicilian leader of Manhattan's Lower East Side gang. The two Italians immediately became friends and partners. Several older members of Luciano's mob family disapproved of this growing partnership. They were mostly old-school mafiosi who were unwilling to work with anyone who was not Italian, and skeptical at best about working with non-Sicilians. To Luciano's shock, they warned him against working with Costello, whom they called "the dirty Calabrian." 

Along with Italian American associates Vito Genovese and Tommy "Three-Finger Brown" Lucchese, and Jewish associates Meyer Lansky and Benjamin "Bugsy" Siegel, the gang became involved in robbery, theft, extortion, gambling and narcotics. The Luciano-Costello-Lansky-Siegel alliance prospered even further with the passage of Prohibition in 1920. The gang went into bootlegging, backed by criminal financier Arnold "the Brain" Rothstein.

The young Italians' success let them make business deals with the leading Jewish and Irish criminals of the era, including Dutch Schultz, Owney "the Killer" Madden and William "Big Bill" Dwyer. Rothstein became a mentor to Costello, Luciano, Lansky and Siegel while they conducted bootlegging business with Bronx beer baron Schultz. In 1922, Costello, Luciano, and their closest Italian associates joined the Sicilian crime family led by Joe "the Boss" Masseria, a top Italian underworld crime boss. By 1924, Costello had become a close associate of Hell's Kitchen's Irish crime bosses Dwyer and Madden. He became involved in their rum-running operations, known as "The Combine"; this might have prompted him to change his last name to the Irish "Costello."

In 1925, Costello became a U.S. citizen.

On November 19, 1926, Costello and Dwyer were indicted on federal bootlegging charges. They were accused of bribing two U.S. Coast Guardsmen, presumably so that they would not disturb the unloading of liquor from boats in New York Harbor. The largest boat in the Combine fleet could carry 20,000 cases of liquor. In January 1927, the jury deadlocked on the bootlegging charges for Dwyer and Costello.

In 1926, Dwyer was convicted of bribing a Coast Guard official and sentenced to two years in jail. After Dwyer was imprisoned, Costello took over the Combine's operations with Madden. This caused friction between Madden and a top Dwyer lieutenant, Charles "Vannie" Higgins, who believed he should have been running the Combine instead of Costello. Thus, the "Manhattan Beer Wars" began between Higgins on one side, and Costello, Madden, and Schultz on the other. At this time, Schultz was also having problems with gangsters Jack "Legs" Diamond and Vincent "Mad Dog" Coll, who had begun to rival Schultz and his partners with Higgins's help. Eventually, the Costello-Madden-Schultz alliance was destroyed by New York's underworld.

In the late 1920s, Johnny Torrio helped to organize a loose cartel of East Coast bootleggers, the Big Seven, in which a number of prominent gangsters, including Costello, Luciano, Longy Zwillman, Joe Adonis, and Meyer Lansky played a part. Torrio also supported creation of a national body that would prevent the sort of all-out turf wars between gangs that had broken out in Chicago and New York. His idea was well received,<ref>Howard Abadinsky, Organized Crime," Cengage Learning, 2009, p.115</ref> and a conference was hosted in Atlantic City by Torrio, Lansky, Luciano and Costello in May 1929; the National Crime Syndicate was created.

Castellammarese War
In early 1931, the Castellammarese War broke out between Masseria and Salvatore Maranzano. In a secret deal with Maranzano, Luciano agreed to engineer the death of his boss, Masseria, in return for receiving Masseria's rackets and becoming Maranzano's second-in-command. On April 15, 1931, Luciano had lured Masseria to a meeting where he was murdered at a restaurant called Nuova Villa Tammaro on Coney Island. While they played cards, Luciano allegedly excused himself to the bathroom, with the gunmen reportedly being Genovese, Albert Anastasia, Joe Adonis, and Benjamin "Bugsy" Siegel; Ciro "The Artichoke King" Terranova drove the getaway car, but legend has it that he was too shaken up to drive away and had to be shoved out of the driver's seat by Siegel. Luciano took over Masseria's family, with Genovese as his underboss.

In September 1931, Luciano and Genovese planned the murder of Maranzano. Luciano had received word that Maranzano was planning to kill him and Genovese, and prepared a hit team to kill Maranzano first. On September 10, 1931, when Maranzano summoned Luciano, Genovese, and Costello to a meeting at his office, they knew Maranzano would kill them there. Instead, Luciano sent to Maranzano's office four Jewish gangsters whose faces were unknown to Maranzano's people. They had been secured with the aid of Lansky and Siegel. After assassinating Maranzano, Luciano subsequently created The Commission to serve as the governing body for organized crime.

Years as consigliere
In 1931, after the Masseria and Maranzano murders, Luciano became the leader of the new Luciano crime family, with Genovese as underboss and Costello as consigliere. Costello quickly became one of the biggest earners for the Luciano family and began to carve his own niche in the underworld. He controlled the slot machine and bookmaking operations for the family with associate Philip "Dandy Phil" Kastel. Costello placed approximately 25,000 slot machines in bars, restaurants, cafes, drugstores, gas stations, and bus stops throughout New York. In 1934, Mayor Fiorello La Guardia confiscated thousands of Costello's slot machines, loaded them on a barge, and dumped them into the river. Costello's next move was to accept Louisiana governor Huey Long's proposal to put slot machines throughout Louisiana for 10% of the take. Costello made Kastel overseer of the Louisiana slot operation. Kastel had the assistance of New Orleans mafioso Carlos "Little Man" Marcello. Costello brought in millions of dollars in profit from slot machines and bookmaking to the Luciano family.

Boss and prison
In 1936, Luciano was convicted of running a prostitution ring and sentenced to 30 to 50 years in state prison. He attempted to rule the crime family from prison with the help of Costello and Lansky, but found it too difficult. With Luciano's imprisonment, Genovese became acting boss of the Luciano crime family. In 1937, Genovese was indicted for a 1934 murder and fled to Italy to avoid prosecution. Luciano then appointed Costello as acting boss. His underboss was his cousin Willie Moretti.

From May 1950 to May 1951, the U.S. Senate conducted a large-scale investigation of organized crime, commonly known as the Kefauver Hearings, chaired by Senator Estes Kefauver of Tennessee. Costello was convicted of contempt of the Senate and sentenced to 18 months in prison. Senator Kefauver concluded that politician Carmine DeSapio was assisting the activities of Costello, and that Costello had become influential in decisions made by the Tammany Hall council. DeSapio admitted to having met Costello several times, but insisted that "politics was never discussed". In 1952, the government began proceedings to strip Costello of his U.S. citizenship, and he was indicted for evasion of $73,417 in income taxes between 1946 and 1949. He was sentenced to five years in prison and fined $20,000. In 1954, Costello appealed the conviction and was released on $50,000 bail; from 1952 to 1961 he was in and out of half a dozen federal and local prisons and jails, his confinement interrupted by periods when he was out on bail pending determination of appeals.

Assassination attempt and aftermath

In 1956, Adonis, a powerful Costello ally, chose deportation to Italy over a long prison sentence. His departure left Costello weakened, but Genovese still had to neutralize one more powerful Costello ally, Anastasia, who had taken over the Mangano crime family after the disappearance of boss Vincent Mangano and the murder of brother Philip Mangano on April 14, 1951.

In early 1957, Genovese decided to move on Costello. Genovese ordered Vincent Gigante to murder Costello, and on May 2, 1957, Gigante shot and wounded Costello outside his apartment building. The altercation persuaded Costello to relinquish power to Genovese and retire. Genovese then controlled what is now called the Genovese crime family. A doorman identified Gigante as the gunman, but in 1958 Costello testified that he was unable to recognize his assailant; Gigante was acquitted of attempted murder.

On October 25, 1957, Anastasia was murdered at the barber shop of the Park Sheraton Hotel at 56th Street and 7th Avenue in Manhattan. Carlo Gambino was expected to be proclaimed boss of Anastasia's family at the November 14, 1957, Apalachin Meeting. Genovese called to discuss the future of Cosa Nostra in light of his takeover. When police raided the meeting, to the detriment of Genovese's reputation, Gambino's appointment was postponed to a later meeting in New York City. In 1959, Genovese was convicted of selling a large quantity of heroin. On April 17, 1959, Genovese was sentenced to 15 years in the Atlanta Federal Penitentiary in Atlanta, Georgia.

Retirement and death

During his retirement, Costello was still known as "The Prime Minister of the Underworld". He still retained power and influence in New York's Mafia and remained busy throughout his final years. Cosa Nostra bosses and old associates such as Gambino and Lucchese still paid visits to Costello at his Waldorf Astoria penthouse, seeking advice on important Mafia affairs. Costello's old friend Meyer Lansky also kept in touch. Costello occupied himself with gardening and displayed some of his flowers at local horticultural shows.

On February 20, 1961, the United States Supreme Court upheld a lower court order that stripped Costello of his US citizenship. But on February 17, 1964, the same court set aside a deportation order for Costello, citing a legal technicality.

In early February 1973, Costello suffered a heart attack at his Manhattan home and was rushed to Doctors Hospital in Manhattan, where he died on February 18. Costello's sedate memorial service at a Manhattan funeral home was attended by 50 relatives, friends, and law enforcement agents. Costello is interred in a private mausoleum in St. Michael's Cemetery in East Elmhurst, Queens. In 1974, after his enemy Carmine Galante was released from prison, he allegedly ordered the bombing of the doors to Costello's mausoleum.

Popular culture
 Costello has been portrayed in several movies, including by actors Feodor Chaliapin, Jr. in My Brother Anastasia (1973), James Andronica in Gangster Wars (1981), Carmine Caridi in Bugsy (1991), Costas Mandylor in Mobsters (1991), and by Kirk Baltz in the television movie Kingfish: A Story of Huey P. Long (1995).
 Costello was referenced in the Allen Ginsberg poem "Hadda Be Playing on the Jukebox". The line is written: 'It had to be FBI chief J. Edgar Hoover / and Frank Costello syndicate mouthpiece / meeting in Central Park, New York weekends, / reported Time magazine'. The poem was later performed live (with music) by the band Rage Against the Machine on the album Live & Rare.
 The film The Departed features an Irish mob boss named Frank Costello (played by Jack Nicholson) in present-day Boston. Nicholson's character is related to the real-life Costello in name only; the character was based on Boston mobster "Whitey" Bulger, with the film plot based on Infernal Affairs, a Hong Kong thriller film made in 2002.
 Costello was portrayed by Anthony DiCarlo in AMC's docudrama series The Making of the Mob: New York.
 He was portrayed by Paul Sorvino in the 2019 television series Godfather of Harlem''.
 Costello is portrayed in the upcoming film Wise Guys by Robert De Niro.

Footnotes

References

External links 

 
 Frank Costello at Rotten.com
 Seize The Night: Frank Costello
 The Free Information Society: Frank Costello Biography 

1891 births
1973 deaths
American crime bosses
American gangsters of Italian descent
American people convicted of tax crimes
Bosses of the Genovese crime family
Capo dei capi
Consiglieri
Genovese crime family
Italian emigrants to the United States
Italian crime bosses
Italian gangsters
People from East Harlem
People from Cassano all'Ionio
People of Calabrian descent
Prohibition-era gangsters